Serotonin is a monoamine neurotransmitter.

Serotonin may also refer to:

 Serotonin (album), or the title track, by the Mystery Jets, 2010
 Serotonin (novel), by Michel Houellebecq, 2019
 "Serotonin" (song), by Girl in Red, 2021
 Serotonin (wrestling), a professional wrestling stable
 "Serotonin", a 2022 song by Tom Walker
 "Serotonin", a 2009 song by Widescreen Mode

See also
 Serotonin transporter
 Serotonin reuptake inhibitor